The New York Canal is an irrigation canal in the western United States, located in southwestern Idaho. Sourced from the Boise River, it originates at the Diversion Dam in Ada County and ends after  at Lake Lowell in Canyon County.

History
Completion of the Oregon Short Line Railroad in the early 1880s made possible the construction of farming settlements in the Boise Valley. In 1882, investors from New York founded the Idaho Mining and Irrigation Company in order to transform the desert into farmland between the Boise River and the Snake River in southern Idaho Territory. Investors hoped that the company could also begin mining operations in the region, financed by revenue from irrigation canals.

Mining engineer Arthur De Wint Foote commenced a survey of the Boise Valley in 1883, and he envisioned a  canal that would draw water from the south side of the Boise River and irrigate  of desert through 5,000 lateral ditches. The main canal became known as the New York Canal, in deference to eastern investors. It was not the first irrigation system in the Boise Valley; in 1878, William H. Ridenbaugh began construction of the Ridenbaugh Canal from the north side of the Boise River, and smaller projects had existed beginning in the 1860s.

In the 1880s, work on the New York Canal focused mainly on the Foote survey and on acquiring water rights. The difficulty of work partially accounted for slow progress on the canal, but another factor was the Depression of 1882–85, and some eastern investors had been forced to divest their holdings in the company. Arthur Foote continued to work with little pay, and the company allowed only a minimum construction effort, this to retain its water rights.

In 1888, the Idaho Statesman objected to claims that the New York Canal would be completed that year. The newspaper found that "maps and profiles" were the only work finished, and the editor projected that the canal would require 500 workers over five years before it was completed. Another Boise River project undertaken by the company, the Phyllis Canal, named for investors from Philadelphia, also had completed about two miles. The Phyllis Canal later became part of the New York Canal system.

In 1890, the company secured investment capital of $300,000 to complete work on the canal. The general contractor was Denver railroad builder William C. Bradbury, and the company believed the canal would be finished in 1891. By September, 1890, 220 workers were employed, and the company advertised employment for 1000 workers. But progress on the canal continued into 1892, when work stopped because of disagreements between investors; work resumed in 1893.

The Idaho Mining and Irrigation Company became insolvent in 1891, and contractor Bradbury filed a lien against the company that year. Bradbury continued construction on the canal, apparently financed by his own money. He purchased the canal, right of way, and water rights in a sheriff's auction in 1894. Bradbury later sold the uncompleted canal to the Farmers' Canal Company, an association of about 175 local farmers, in 1896.

The United States Congress created the U.S. Reclamation Service in in 1902, and the bureau gained control of the New York Canal project. After trimming several miles from the former design and completing construction of the canal and diversion dam, the bureau opened the New York Canal on February 22, 1909. The canal was enlarged by 1912, and it was placed under control of the Boise Project in 1926.

See also
 List of canals in the United States
 Carey Act

References

External links
 
 New York Irrigation District
 Boise Project, Bureau of Reclamation
 Anne Wallace Allen, A hardy pair of early Idahoans, Arthur and Mary Hallock Foote (Idaho Business Review, May 23, 2016)

Geography of Ada County, Idaho
Geography of Canyon County, Idaho
Boise Project
1909 establishments in Idaho
Canals in Idaho